Sara Varga Madeleine Jonsson (born 14 April 1982), known professionally as Sara Varga, is a Swedish vispop singer, songwriter, author, and DJ.

In Summer 2010, Varga went on concert tour together with Swedish boy band Rebound!. In Autumn 2010 she was DJ in the 4th season of the TV-program Raw Comedy Club.
Varga contested Melodifestivalen 2011 with the song "Spring för livet", which she wrote together with Figge Boström, and finished in ninth place. She participated again in Melodifestivalen 2017 with Juha Mulari with the song "Du får inte ändra på mig", however she did not qualify for the final.

Bibliography
Från groda till prins (2007)

Discography

Albums
Faith, Hope & Love (2008)
Spring för livet (2011)
Ett år av tystnad (2012)

Singles
Always Have (2008)
Du gick (2010)
Spring för livet (2011)

References

External links

Sara Varga's blog 
Official website

Swedish DJs
English-language singers from Sweden
Swedish-language singers
Swedish songwriters
Swedish women writers
Living people
1982 births
Singers from Stockholm
Writers from Stockholm
Electronic dance music DJs
21st-century Swedish singers
21st-century Swedish women singers
Melodifestivalen contestants of 2017
Melodifestivalen contestants of 2011